Kamal Singh (born 29 November 2000) is an Indian cricketer. He made his first-class debut on 12 February 2020, for Uttarakhand in the 2019–20 Ranji Trophy, scoring a century in the first innings. He made his List A debut on 21 February 2021, for Uttarakhand in the 2020–21 Vijay Hazare Trophy.

References

External links
 

2000 births
Living people
Indian cricketers
Uttarakhand cricketers
Place of birth missing (living people)